Twilight of Shadows (Ghouroub Edhilal) is a 2014 Algerian drama film directed by Mohammed Lakhdar-Hamina. The film was selected as the Algerian entry for the Best Foreign Language Film at the 88th Academy Awards but it was not nominated.

Plot
The film is set against the backdrop of the Algerian War. A determined French commander, who believes Algeria belongs to France, must deal with a soldier who rebels when asked to execute an Algerian freedom fighter. The finale is set in the blistering desert as the soldier seeks to escape.

Cast
 Samir Boitard - Khaled
 Nicolas Bridet - Lambert
 Laurent Hennequin - Commandant Saintenac
 Bernard Montiel - The Teacher
 Mehdi Tahmi
 Merouane Mansouri

See also
 List of submissions to the 88th Academy Awards for Best Foreign Language Film
 List of Algerian submissions for the Academy Award for Best Foreign Language Film

References

External links
 

2014 films
2014 drama films
2010s Arabic-language films
Films scored by Vangelis
Algerian drama films